WABO-FM (105.5 MHz) is a radio station  broadcasting a variety hits format. Licensed to Waynesboro, Mississippi, United States.  The station is currently owned by Jamie Heathcock .

History
The station went on the air as WABO-FM on 1979-02-01.  on 1979-03-20, the station changed its call sign to WABO.

References

External links

ABO-FM